Aechmalotus is a genus of worms belonging to the family Hallangiidae.

The species of this genus are found in Northern Europe.

Species:
 Aechmalotus pyrula Beklemischev, 1915

References

Acoelomorphs